George Lawton (4 August 1862 – 1930) was an English footballer who played in the Football League for Stoke.

Career
George Lawton joined Stoke St Peter's in 1884. In July 1885, he signed for Stoke, playing in both FA Cup matches in the 1885–86 season as Stoke lost to Crewe Alexandra in a replay. In January 1886 he joined nearby Burslem Port Vale, where he scored three times in thirteen friendlies, before returning to Stoke in the May of that year. Stoke' major achievement from 1886 to 1888 was reaching the 1887–88 FA Cup Fifth Round. The tie was played on 7 January 1888 at Stoney Lane, the then home of West Bromwich Albion. Stoke lost 4–1. Lawton played in all four FA Cup ties in 1887–88 and scored two goals.

Lawton made his League debut on 13 October 1888, playing as a winger, in a 2–1 defeat to Bolton Wanderers at Pike's Lane. He scored his home debut seven days later against Burnley at the Victoria Ground, the score was 3–3 with three minutes of play left when Lawton scored the winner to make it 4–3. Lawton appeared in 13 of the 22 league matches played by Stoke in the 1888–89 season, scoring one league goal. As a winger (13 appearances) Lawton played in a Stoke midfield that achieved big (three–League–goals–or–more) wins once. Stoke finished bottom of the table and at the end of the season Lawton joined Altrincham. In 1890 he moved from Altrincham to Belvedere.

Career statistics

References

Footballers from Stoke-on-Trent
English footballers
Association football wingers
Stoke City F.C. players
Port Vale F.C. players
Altrincham F.C. players
English Football League players
1930 deaths
1862 births